Han de Wit  is a 1990 Dutch drama film directed by Joost Ranzijn.

Cast
Koen De Bouw - Han de Wit
Nelly Frijda - Moeder
Jim van der Woude - Vader 
 - Nellie 
Huub van der Lubbe - Zeeman 
Hans Beijer - Boekhouder 
Kees Hulst - Dokter 
Leny Breederveld - Dokter 
Hans Trentelman - Dokter 
Mimi Kok - Psychiater 
Patrick Muller - Blinde Douwe 
Sonja Paal - Buurvrouw 
Han Kerkhoffs - Brillenverkoper 
Ria Marks - Verpleegster Skelet 
Annette Nijder - Verpleegster

External links 
 

1990 films
1990s Dutch-language films
1990 drama films
Dutch drama films